, was a Japanese far-right politician who served as a member of the House of Representatives of Japan during World War II.

Akao was cofounder and first president of the Kenkokukai and became one of the leading ultranationalists in Japan during the 1920s. Akao was elected to the House of Representatives as an independent in 1942 and espoused a unique type of Japanese nationalism characterized by support for the United States and opposition to the Pacific War. Akao founded and became the first president of the far-right Greater Japan Patriotic Party in 1951 and continued to adamantly champion pro-United States and anti-communist stances in post-war Japan.

Early life
Bin Akao was born on 15 January 1899 in Higashi Ward, Nagoya, the son of a hardware dealer. Akao was sickly as a child and he contracted tuberculosis while a student at Aichi Third Junior High School. In order to aid his recovery, he was sent to manage a farm owned by his father on the island of Miyakejima. While on the island, Akao became acquainted with Inejirō Asanuma, the future chairman of the Japan Socialist Party, as well as Inejiro's distant relative Michio Asanuma, who would later become a member of Akao's Greater Japan Patriotic Party.

On the farm, Akao sought to create a utopian society by implementing a primitive form of agrarian communism based on the ideals of the "New Village Movement" advocated by poet-philosopher Saneatsu Mushanokōji. In particular, the produce of the farm was distributed in equal shares to all workers on the farm, regardless of class or social standing. However, Akao's neighbors on the island felt threatened by his practices, and managed to swindle the farm from him through legalistic maneuvers. Disillusioned by the failure of his experiments with communism, Akao returned to the mainland and settled in Tokyo, where he began to dabble in socialism under the influence of Toshihiko Sakai, Hitoshi Yamakawa, Sakae Osugi, and Motoyuki Takabatake. Akao was arrested and imprisoned for a speech critical of Japan's Emperor system after being conscripted into military service. While in prison, Akao became disillusioned with the left-wing movement in Japan and soon abandoned left-wing politics as a whole.

Ultranationalism
In 1926, Akao "converted" (tenkō suru) to ultranationalism while still imprisoned and began his foray into right-wing Japanese politics. Thereafter, he became a vocal opponent of the Soviet Union and communism. That year, Akao became cofounder and president of the Kenkokukai (National Foundation Society), a major ultranationalist organization of the 1920s that ultimately reached a nationwide membership of around 120,000. Akao was a close associate of legal scholar Uesugi Shinkichi, who allowed him to run the Kenkokukai from his home after the withdrawal of several prominent members left the organization without the means to fund their headquarters.

One consistent aspect of Akao's thought was his respect for the power of the United States, having opposed the Pacific War from a nationalist perspective on the grounds that the United States was too powerful for Japan and therefore that fighting a war with it was foolhardy.

In the 1942 election, Akao ran for the Tokyo 6th district seat in the National Diet as a "non-recommended candidate," meaning he was not recommended by the single national political party, the Imperial Rule Assistance Association (IRAA). Nevertheless, Akao won the election and received the second most votes in Tokyo and the fourth most votes of anyone in Japan. Like other independent candidates, Akao dutifully joined the IRAA upon winning his seat.

Post-war activism
Akao was defeated for re-election in 1945, and shortly thereafter was purged by the US military occupation of Japan as a wartime leader. Akao's purge was reversed in 1951 as part of the Reverse Course and he vowed to return to elected office. To this end, Akao established a new political party, the Greater Japan Patriotic Party (GJPP), which was ideologically virulently anti-communist and pro-American. As a member of this party, Akao stood for several elected positions but never won. Increasingly, he seemed less interested in winning elections and more interested in stirring up debate. His use of noise trucks and street corner speechifying was a model for later right-wing movements in Japan.

In 1960, during the Anpo Protests against the US-Japan Security Treaty, Akao became convinced that Japan was on the verge of a communist revolution and sought to rally right-wing groups to engage in counter-protests. Both Otoya Yamaguchi, who assassinated Inejirō Asanuma, and Kazutaka Komori, who perpetrated the Shimanaka Incident, were 17-year-old members of the GJPP who resigned from the party shortly before committing their violent attacks, leading many people to speculate that Akao had ordered both attacks. Akao was arrested for conspiracy to murder in the wake of the Shimanaka Incident, but was not indicted due to lack of evidence, and instead was sentenced to eight months in prison for the lesser charges of disturbing the peace and intimidation.

Later years and death

Akao continued his activism and took to flying the American flag and the Union Jack on his noise trucks alongside the Hinomaru, and strongly supported the revised Security Treaty and the U.S.-Japan alliance. Akao was a strong supporter of South Korea, mainly for its anti-communism, and advocated close alliance between South Korea and Japan. Akao once stated that the Liancourt Rocks should be blown up as the dispute over the islets represented an obstacle to friendship between the two countries.

In 1989, following the death of Emperor Hirohito, Akao ran for a seat in the House of Councilors for a 15th time, at the age of 90. Akao died of heart failure on February 6, 1990, at the age of 91, in Toshima, Tokyo.

See also 
 Uyoku dantai

References

External links 
 「平成元年の右翼……右翼の未来はあるか？」 （1989年、JICC出版局） 

1899 births
1990 deaths
People from Nagoya
Japanese anti-communists
Members of the House of Representatives (Empire of Japan)
Politicians from Aichi Prefecture